Qaleh Gar-e Fahlian (also Romanized as Qal‘eh Gar-e Fahlīān; also known as Gar-e Fahlīān, Qal‘eh Gar, Qal‘eh-ye Gar, Qal‘eh-ye Gardaneh, and Qal’eh-ye Gardū) is a village in Fahlian Rural District, in the Central District of Mamasani County, Fars Province, Iran. At the 2006 census, its population was 412, in 97 families.

References 

Populated places in Mamasani County